Arteshabad (also Romanized as Arteshābād; also known as Sekmesābād) is a village in Kharaqan-e Sharqi Rural District, Abgarm District, Avaj County, Qazvin Province, Iran. At the 2006 census, its population was 659, in 200 families.

References 

Populated places in Avaj County